Blakea maguirei is a species of plant in the family Melastomataceae. It is endemic to Ecuador.

References

maguirei
Endangered plants
Endemic flora of Ecuador
Taxonomy articles created by Polbot
Taxobox binomials not recognized by IUCN